Use Your Illusion II is the fourth studio album by the American hard rock band Guns N' Roses. The album was released on September 17, 1991, the same day as its counterpart Use Your Illusion I. Both albums were released in conjunction with the Use Your Illusion Tour. Bolstered by the lead single "You Could Be Mine", Use Your Illusion II was the slightly more popular of the two albums, selling a record 770,000 copies its first week and debuting at number 1 on the U.S. charts, ahead of Use Your Illusion I'''s first-week sales of 685,000. As of 2010, Use Your Illusion II has sold 5,587,000 units in the United States, according to Nielsen SoundScan. Both albums have since been certified 7× Platinum by the RIAA. It was also No. 1 on the UK Albums Chart for a single week.

It is the last Guns N' Roses album to feature rhythm guitarist Izzy Stradlin. It also includes "Civil War", the last track to feature drummer Steven Adler in any capacity. This album, along with the counterpart of the album, was the last Guns N' Roses album to feature original material until 2008's album Chinese Democracy.

Overview
The Use Your Illusion albums were a stylistic turning point for Guns N' Roses (see Use Your Illusion I). In addition, Use Your Illusion II is more political than most of their previous work, with songs like "Civil War", a cover of Bob Dylan's "Knockin' on Heaven's Door", and "Get in the Ring" dealing respectively with the topics of violence, law enforcement and media bias. The thematic material deals less with drug use than previous Guns N' Roses albums. Use Your Illusion I featured several songs pre-Appetite for Destruction while Use Your Illusion II featured more tracks written during and after Appetite For Destruction.

The band's cover of "Knockin' on Heaven's Door" had been released almost a year earlier on the Days of Thunder soundtrack, while "Civil War" debuted at the 1990 Farm Aid concert. That concert also featured Guns N' Roses playing a cover of the U.K. Subs song "Down on the Farm", a studio version of which would later appear on the band's 1993 release of cover songs, "The Spaghetti Incident?". "Civil War" was released as a B-side to "You Could Be Mine". The song had also been released on a charity album called Nobody's Child, a fund-raising compilation for Romanian orphans.

"You Could Be Mine" was released in June 1991 and is featured in the film Terminator 2: Judgment Day. The song was not released on the actual soundtrack. The band also filmed a video featuring Arnold Schwarzenegger in character as the Terminator, with a loose plot featuring Axl Rose as its "target". However, he is saved from termination as he is deemed a "waste of ammo" by the T-800's lock-on system. The original subject matter of the song dealt with Izzy Stradlin's failed relationship with ex-girlfriend Angela Nicoletti.

The Use Your Illusion albums can be considered a single cohesive work, and certain elements of Use Your Illusion II underscore this intent. For instance, both albums have a version of the song "Don't Cry", and both have one cover song; "Live and Let Die" by Paul McCartney (Use Your Illusion I) and "Knockin' on Heaven's Door" by Bob Dylan (Use Your Illusion II). Each also has at least one track sung by other members of the band: lead vocals are performed by bassist Duff McKagan on "So Fine," a song that was dedicated to punk rock musician Johnny Thunders, who died from a drug overdose before the recording of the album.

The song "Get in the Ring" finds the band lashing out at a career's worth of critics and enemies. Among those referred to by name are editors of several entertainment magazines. The industrial flavored "My World", the final track, was written and recorded in three hours, with Rose claiming those in the recording room were on mushrooms at the time.

The band had some difficulty achieving the final sound, especially during the mixing stages of both albums. According to a 1991 cover story by Rolling Stone magazine, after mixing 21 tracks with engineer/producer Bob Clearmountain, the band fired Clearmountain when he tried to replace the real drums with samples. According to Slash's autobiography, "one afternoon we discovered a notepad of his where he'd notated all the drum samples he planned to mix in over Matt's drum tracks" the band decided to scrap the mixes and start from scratch with engineer Bill Price of Sex Pistols fame.

Slash has stated that most of the material for the album was written on acoustic guitars in a couple of nights at his house (the Walnut House), after several months of non-productivity. According to Slash "Breakdown" was one of the most complicated songs to record on the album; the banjo, drum, and piano parts were hard to synchronize and drummer Matt Sorum "lost it" a couple of times trying to get the drums just right. The song "Locomotive" was written in a house Slash and Izzy Stradlin rented in the Hollywood Hills following the Appetite for Destruction tours. The song shows the group dabbling in funk metal, and is also the only song on either album where the phrase "use your illusion" appears as a lyric.

Artwork

Both albums' covers are the work of Estonian-American artist Mark Kostabi. They consist of detail from Raphael's painting The School of Athens. The highlighted figure, unlike many of those in the painting, has not been identified with any specific philosopher. The only difference in the artwork between the albums is the color scheme used for each album. Use Your Illusion II uses blue and purple. The original painting was titled by Paul Kostabi as Use Your Illusion and also became the title of both albums. Both Use Your Illusion albums' liner notes include the message "Fuck You, St. Louis!" amongst the thank you notes, a reference to the Riverport Riot near there at the Hollywood Casino Amphitheatre in July 1991 during the Use Your Illusion Tour.

ReceptionUse Your Illusion II received positive reviews, though some critics rated it lower than Use Your Illusion I. AllMusic reviewer Stephen Thomas Erlewine, in a 3 out of 5 review, stated "Use Your Illusion II is more serious and ambitious than I, but it's also considerably more pretentious." Erlewine criticized what he perceived as filler on the album, singling out the songs "So Fine", "Get in the Ring", "Knockin' On Heaven's Door", "My World" and the alternate version of "Don't Cry". Rolling Stone stated "the band rewards the loyal legions – with 14 songs, which range from ballad to battle, pretty to vulgar, worldly to incredibly naive." The Chicago Tribune (in a dual review with Use Your Illusion I), stated the albums "represent a staggering leap in ambition, musicianship, production and songwriting" and "rank with the best hard rock of the last decade." Rolling Stone'' listed the album at number 41 in their list "100 Best Albums of the 90s".

Track listing

Personnel
W. Axl Rose – lead vocals, piano, whistling, backing vocals, rhythm guitar on "Shotgun Blues", synthesizer, drum machine
Slash – lead guitar, rhythm guitar, acoustic guitar, banjo, backing vocals
Izzy Stradlin – rhythm guitar, backing vocals, lead vocals on "14 Years", acoustic guitar, coral sitar, lead guitar
Duff McKagan – bass, backing vocals, lead vocals on "So Fine", percussion
Matt Sorum – drums, backing vocals
Dizzy Reed – keyboard, backing vocals

Additional musicians
Steven Adler – drums on "Civil War"
Johann Langlie – drums, keyboards and sound effects on "My World"
The Waters – backing vocals on "Knockin' On Heaven's Door"
Howard Teman – piano on "So Fine"
Shannon Hoon – co-lead vocals on "Don't Cry"

Production personnel

Mike Clink – production, engineering
Jim Mitchell – additional engineering
Bill Price – mixing
George Marino – mastering
Kevin Reagan – art direction, graphic design
Mark Kostabi – artwork
Robert John – photography
Allen Abrahamson – assistant engineer
Buzz Burrowes – assistant engineer
Chris Puram – assistant engineer
Craig Portelis – assistant engineer
Ed Goodreau – assistant engineer
Jason Roberts – assistant engineer
John Aguto – assistant engineer
L. Stu Young – assistant engineer
Leon Granados – assistant engineer
Mike Douglass – assistant engineer
Talley Sherwood – assistant engineer

Charts

Weekly charts

Year-end charts

Decade-end charts

Certifications

See also
List of best-selling albums in Argentina
List of best-selling albums in Germany
List of glam metal albums and songs

References

1991 albums
Guns N' Roses albums
Geffen Records albums
Albums produced by Mike Clink
Albums recorded at Metalworks Studios
Albums recorded at Record Plant (Los Angeles)